Seema Punia-Antil (born 27 July 1983) is an Indian discus thrower.

Early life
Seema Antil was born in Khewda village of Sonipat district in Haryana. Her sporting career began at the age of 11 years as a hurdler and a long-jumper, but later took to discus throw. Her gold medal win at the World Junior Championships in 2000 in Santiago earned her the nickname: 'Millennium Child'. She studied in the Government College, Sonipat.

Career
Antil originally won a gold medal at the 2000 World Junior Championships, but she lost it due to a positive drugs' test for pseudoephedrine. As per the rules in force at that time for such an offence, her National Federation issued her a public warning after stripping her of the medal. She won a bronze medal at the next World Junior Championships in 2002.

She won a silver medal at the 2006 Commonwealth Games, and was honoured with Bhim Award by the Haryana state government on 26 June 2006. Her absence from the 2006 Asian Games attracted considerable media attention. She had tested positive for a steroid (stanozolol) prior to the Games but was cleared to participate by her National Federation. She, however, opted out of the team for the Games.

She won a bronze medal at the 2010 Commonwealth Games. She finished 13th at the 2012 London Olympics. In 2014, she won a silver medal at the Commonwealth Games and a gold at the Asian Games.

Personal life
Antil is married to Ankush Punia, her coach, and a former discus thrower who represented India at 2004 Summer Olympics in Athens.

International competitions

See also
List of sportspeople sanctioned for doping offences

References

External links

1983 births
Living people
Indian female discus throwers
21st-century Indian women
21st-century Indian people
Olympic athletes of India
Athletes (track and field) at the 2004 Summer Olympics
Athletes (track and field) at the 2012 Summer Olympics
Athletes (track and field) at the 2016 Summer Olympics
Athletes (track and field) at the 2020 Summer Olympics
Commonwealth Games silver medallists for India
Commonwealth Games bronze medallists for India
Commonwealth Games medallists in athletics
Athletes (track and field) at the 2006 Commonwealth Games
Athletes (track and field) at the 2010 Commonwealth Games
Athletes (track and field) at the 2014 Commonwealth Games
Athletes (track and field) at the 2018 Commonwealth Games
Athletes (track and field) at the 2022 Commonwealth Games
Asian Games gold medalists for India
Asian Games bronze medalists for India
Asian Games medalists in athletics (track and field)
Athletes (track and field) at the 2014 Asian Games
Athletes (track and field) at the 2018 Asian Games
Sportswomen from Haryana
People from Sonipat
Doping cases in athletics
Indian sportspeople in doping cases
Medalists at the 2014 Asian Games
Medalists at the 2018 Asian Games
Athletes from Haryana
Recipients of the Arjuna Award
Medallists at the 2018 Commonwealth Games